This article lists power stations in Botswana. This list is incomplete. You can help.

Thermal

Solar

PV solar

Concentrated solar

See also 

 List of power stations in Africa
 List of largest power stations in the world

References 

Botswana
Power stations